Studia Quaternaria is a peer-reviewed open access scholarly journal publishing research articles on quaternary science. It is a journal published by the Polish Academy of Sciences (PAN). The current editor-in-chief is Leszek Marks. 
It changed name from Quaternary Studies in Poland to the current title in the year 2000.

Abstracting and indexing 
The journal is abstracted and indexed in:

References

External links 
 

Open access journals
Publications established in 1979
Geology journals